New Guelderland is a town in KwaDukuza in the KwaZulu-Natal province of South Africa.

It was established in 1859, when Theodorus Colenbrander brought a party of 80 Dutch immigrants to his settlement and named it after Guelderland in the Netherlands.

References

1859 establishments in South Africa
Populated places established in 1859
Populated places in the KwaDukuza Local Municipality